The list of admirals of the German Navy consists flag officers of the German Navy. The year-date is related to the promotion to the appropriate admiral's rank.

Active admirals of the German Navy 
The medical officers are incorporated into the table in line to the rank.

Admirals

Vizeadmirals

Konteradmirals

Flottillenadmirals

References

Lists of German military personnel
Lists of admirals